Oscar S. Strático (born January 19, 1956) is a retired competitive judoka from Argentina, who represented his native country at the 1976 Summer Olympics in Montreal, Quebec, Canada.

Strático won the bronze medal at the 1975 Pan American Games in the men's lightweight division (– 70 kg). An older brother of Olympic judoka Alejandro Strático he switched from judo to wrestling, and represented Argentina in this sport at the 1984 Summer Olympics in Los Angeles, California.

References
 Profile

External links
 

1956 births
Living people
Argentine male judoka
Judoka at the 1976 Summer Olympics
Wrestlers at the 1984 Summer Olympics
Argentine male sport wrestlers
Olympic judoka of Argentina
Olympic wrestlers of Argentina
Place of birth missing (living people)
Pan American Games bronze medalists for Argentina
Pan American Games medalists in judo
Judoka at the 1975 Pan American Games
Medalists at the 1975 Pan American Games
Sambokas at the 1983 Pan American Games
20th-century Argentine people
21st-century Argentine people